The  was an army of the Imperial Japanese Army during World War II.

History
The Japanese 16th Army was formed on November 5, 1941 under the Southern Expeditionary Army Group to coordinate the infantry divisions and other Japanese ground forces in the Invasion of Java in the Netherlands East Indies. It remained based on Java throughout the Pacific War as a garrison force.

On March 27, 1944, with the threat of possible landings of Allied forces to retake the Dutch East Indies increasing, the organizational structure of the Southern Expeditionary Army changed and the IJA 16th Army was reassigned to  the Japanese Seventh Area Army. It remained headquartered in Jakarta as a garrison force as before.

The Japanese 16th Army was demobilized at the surrender of Japan on August 15, 1945.

List of commanders

Commanding officer

Chief of Staff

References

Books

External links
 

Military units and formations disestablished in 1945
16
Military units and formations established in 1941